Sasco is a ghost town in Arizona, U.S.

Sasco or SASCO may also refer to
 Sakhalin Shipping Company
 South African Students Congress
 Sasco Brook, a brook bordering Southport, Connecticut
 Saudi Automotive Services Company